This is a list of  Time Team  episodes from series 12.

Episode

Series 12

Episode # refers to the air date order. The Time Team Specials are aired in between regular episodes, but are omitted from this list. Regular contributors on Time Team include: Tony Robinson (presenter); archaeologists Mick Aston, Phil Harding, Carenza Lewis, Helen Geake, Mark Corney, Brigid Gallagher, Matt Williams, Mick Worthington, Ian Powlesland; historians Guy de la Bedoyere, Francis Pryor; Victor Ambrus (illustrator); Stewart Ainsworth (landscape investigator); John Gater (geophysicist); Henry Chapman (surveyor); Paul Blinkhorn (pottery expert).

See also
 Time Team Live
 Time Team History Hunters
 Time Team Digs
 Time Team Extra
 Time Team America
 Time Team Specials
 Time Team Others

References

External links
Time Team at Channel4.com
The Unofficial Time Team site Fan site

Time Team (Series 12)
2005 British television seasons